Federico Freire (born 6 November 1990) is an Argentine footballer who currently plays as a midfielder for Club Atlético San Telmo.

Club career

Vélez Sarsfield
Freire began his professional career with Argentine outfit, Vélez Sarsfield in 2011, earning his first call-up on 29 May 2011, in a 2-1 loss against Tigre. He made his professional debut in a 1-1 home draw with Colón on 27 November 2011. He made 11 official league appearances for the Argentine outfit before moving to the Italian Serie A with Catania.

Calcio Catania
On 5 July 2013, Freire officially signed for Catania, although the 22-year-old midfielder had already signed the contract on 10 June, but it was only deposited in the Lega Serie A today. He was signed on a Bosman free transfer and does not require a non-EU transfer being that the player also obtains a Spanish passport. He made his debut in Serie A match against Torino on 24 November 2013, as a substitute in the last 6 minutes. However, he failed to appear any other matches for Catania in a nearly half-year.

Arsenal de Sarandí
On 3 February 2014, Freire returned to Argentina for Arsenal, ending a short-term career at Catania.
Although he was brought to the team by coach Gustavo Alfaro he failed to play many minutes. On April 15, 2014, coach Alfaro was discharged from Arsenal and coach Martín Palermo was hired.
Quickly, Martín Palermo noticed Freire's skills, and played for the first team two times for the local tournament and six times for the Copa Libertadores.

Honours
 Vélez Sarsfield
 Argentine Primera División (2): 2011 Clausura, 2012 Inicial

References

External links
Profile at Vélez Sársfield's official website 

Living people
1990 births
Argentine footballers
Argentine expatriate footballers
Association football midfielders
Club Atlético Vélez Sarsfield footballers
Catania S.S.D. players
Arsenal de Sarandí footballers
Club Deportivo Universidad de San Martín de Porres players
Olimpo footballers
Club Sportivo Estudiantes players
Gimnasia y Esgrima de Jujuy footballers
San Telmo footballers
Argentine Primera División players
Serie A players
Primera Nacional players
Primera B Metropolitana players
Peruvian Primera División players
Argentine expatriate sportspeople in Italy
Expatriate footballers in Italy
Argentine expatriate sportspeople in Peru
Expatriate footballers in Peru
Footballers from Buenos Aires